The 1932 Case football team represented the Case School of Applied Science, now a part of Case Western Reserve University, during the 1932 college football season. The team's head coach was Ray A. Ride.

Schedule

References

Case
Case Western Reserve Spartans football seasons
Case Scientists football